Pier 66 may refer to:

 North River Pier 66, a public boathouse on the Hudson River in Manhattan, New York, USA
 Pier 66, or Bell Street Pier, a major complex on the downtown waterfront of Seattle, USA
 Pier 66 Maritime, a former railroad barge in New York City; used to dock historic ships and also the location of a bar & grill with entertainment (formerly known as Pier 63 Maritime)
Pier 66 (film), a 1996 film